Stachowski (feminine Stachowska, plural Stachowscy) is a Polish surname. It may refer to:
 Amber Stachowski, American water polo player
 Marek Stachowski (composer), Polish composer
 Marek Stachowski, Polish linguist
 Monika Stachowska, Polish handball player
 William Stachowski, American politician

Polish-language surnames